Niki Nakayama (born 1975 in Los Angeles) is a Japanese-American chef and the owner of Michelin-starred n/naka restaurant in Los Angeles, specializing in modern Japanese kaiseki cuisine.

Early life
Nakayama was born to Japanese parents in Koreatown in Los Angeles. Her parents worked as fish distributors (now run by her older brother) and ended up divorcing when Nakayama was 12. She later attended culinary school in Pasadena, after which she worked at Mori Sushi. "Committed to exploring new techniques," she then began a three-year working tour of Japan, where she immersed herself as much as possible "in the essentials of Japanese cuisine." While there, she cooked at Shirakawa-Ya Ryokan under Chef Masa Sato, a Japanese country-style inn owned by her cousins that was renowned for its kaiseki cuisine. Her experiences with Japanese cuisine deeply influenced her, and upon returning to California, opened Azami Sushi Cafe (known for its all female staff) with the stressful   help of her family. Ultimately, she opened her now famous n/naka restaurant in Los Angeles, where she works with Carole Iida, who is a partner and sous chef at n/naka.

Restaurant & cooking style
Nakayama serves a multi-course Japanese menu which features seasonal ingredients and multiple preparation styles that showcase the chosen ingredients. This way of cooking is known as kaiseki. N/naka is known for serving 13 course meals, in which all the dishes have a natural flow and progression to them, and uses highly seasonal ingredients, some of which come from Nakayama's own home garden which provides plenty of vegetables and herbs. Her "menu emphasizes seasonality, and the courses are structured to showcase ingredients using a sequence of preparations: A raw dish is followed by a grilled dish, then a braised or steamed dish, then a fried dish and so on, from light to heavy to light again. Designed to accompany tea ceremonies in monasteries, kaiseki began in 16th-century Japan as beautifully presented yet austere vegetarian fare. Over the centuries, the cuisine evolved to encompass a nearly opposite concept: food as luxury, a feast for a crowd. (There are actually two different ways of writing the word kaiseki in Japanese: One refers to the simple, monastic interpretation, while the other refers to a banquet.) Nakayama makes what she calls "modern kaiseki," grounded in the Buddhist custom but open to interpretation." Nakayama's style of kaiseki is expressive of her own belief that the chef should never lose track of the ingredient's integrity, and that guest's experience in her restaurant is of the utmost importance.

In 2019, n/naka was one of six Los Angeles restaurants to receive two stars in the Michelin Guide. Also in 2019 n/naka was named to Food & Wine'''s 30 best restaurants in the world.

To potentially avoid prejudiced attitudes, Nakayama works in closed kitchens, where patrons and diners cannot see her or take her gender into consideration when judging the cuisine. She says, "It's better that the guests just focus on the food versus who's making the food. With Japanese food, it's so easy to have an idea of what your chef should look like."

Television
In 2015 Nakayama was featured on episode four of the first season of Netflix's Chef's Table series in which she discusses her career and the many obstacles she has overcome, as well as the many influences that have shaped her into the renowned chef she has become. She was the culinary consultant for the 2019 Netflix film Always Be My Maybe''.

Personal life

Nakayama spent three years working in Japan, including at Shirakawa-Ya Ryokan - a Japanese inn owned by her relatives. While at Ryokan, she trained under chef Masa Sato in the culinary art of kaiseki. Upon returning to the United States, Nakayama opened Azami Sushi Cafe which became popular for its omakase menu. Azami served as a fast-casual Japanese restaurant by day, and a small eight-course chef's table venture at night.

After returning to the United States from Japan, Nakayama has earned two Michelin stars. In 2014, she earned the StarChefs Rising Star Chef Award for her work at n/naka.

Nakayama is married to her partner at n/naka, Carole Iida.

References

Further reading

External links 
 Niki Nakayama at n-naka.com
 

1975 births
Living people
American chefs
American people of Japanese descent
American women chefs
Head chefs of Michelin starred restaurants
Asian American chefs
21st-century American women
Chefs from Los Angeles